Johann Windisch (born 5 January 1941) is an Austrian football defender who played for Austria. He also played for Wiener Sport-Club, Wacker Wien, First Vienna FC and WSV Donawitz.

References

 
 

1941 births
Austrian footballers
Austria international footballers
Association football defenders
Wiener Sport-Club players
DSV Leoben players
First Vienna FC players
FC Admira Wacker Mödling players
Living people